Greystone is a hamlet in Angus, Scotland. It lies between the towns of Carnoustie and Forfar in the parish of Carmyllie.

References

Villages in Angus, Scotland